Highway 3 is a road in Åland that starts in the capital city Mariehamn and ends in the Långnäs port of Lumparland. The length of the road is 26 kilometers. The road starts at the roundabout near Mariehamn Hospital, which also originates on Highway 1 and Highway 2.

The only attraction along the road is the Lemström Canal.

Route 

The road passes through the following localities:
Mariehamn
Jomala
Lemland
Lumparland

See also
Transport in Åland
Finnish national road 3

Source

References

Roads in Åland